Zel Keh-ye Sofla (also Romanized as Z̄el Keh-ye Soflá; also known as Z̄īlakeh-ye Soflá) is a village in Chaybasar-e Shomali Rural District, Bazargan District, Maku County, West Azerbaijan Province, Iran. At the 2006 census, its population was 235, in 49 families.

References 

Populated places in Maku County